Taylor Townsend is an American lawyer and politician who served in the Louisiana House of Representatives from 2000 to 2008.

His father-in-law was state senator and horsebreeder Donald G. Kelly.

Townsend was hired as a lawyer for Governor John Bel Edwards in 2016.

References

American lawyers